Roset or Nordsida is a village in Stryn Municipality in Vestland county, Norway. The village is located on the northern shore of the Nordfjorden. The village of Innvik lies directly across the Nordfjorden from Roset. Nordsida Church is located in Roset.

References

Villages in Vestland
Stryn